The Autobiography of Mark Twain is a lengthy set of reminiscences, dictated, for the most part, in the last few years of the life of American author Mark Twain (1835–1910) and left in typescript and manuscript at his death. The Autobiography comprises a rambling collection of anecdotes and ruminations rather than a conventional autobiography. Twain never compiled these writings and dictations into a publishable form in his lifetime. Despite indications from Twain that he did not want his autobiography to be published for a century, he serialized some Chapters from My Autobiography during his lifetime and various compilations were published during the 20th century. However it was not until 2010 that the first volume of a comprehensive collection, compiled and edited by The Mark Twain Project of the Bancroft Library at University of California, Berkeley, was published.

Twain's writings and dictations

Twain first started to compose an autobiography in 1870, but proceeded fitfully, abandoning the work and returning to it as the mood took him, amassing around 30–40 of these "false starts" over the next 35 years.

The bulk of the autobiography was dictated rather than written directly—this was described by a 2010 reviewer as "[having] a secretary follow him around and take down his every passing thought". In a 1904 letter to William Dean Howells, he wrote: "I’ve struck it! And I will give it away—to you. You will never know how much enjoyment you have lost until you get to dictating your autobiography." These dictations were made frequently in 1906 and 1907. Twain then seems to have let the book languish; in 1908–9 he hardly added to it at all, and he declared the project concluded in 1909, after the death of his youngest daughter Jean. His innovative notion—to "talk only about the thing which interests you for the moment"—meant that his thoughts could range freely. Twain thought his autobiography would be most entertaining if he went off on whims and tangents in non-sequential order.

Twain's papers, including the autobiographical works, were left as part of a trust for the benefit of his surviving daughter, Clara Clemens. These papers passed through the control of a number of editors, and have, since 1971, been held by the Bancroft Library, at the University of California, Berkeley.

Plans for posthumous publication
Writings by Twain show intent for the majority of the material to be published posthumously. In an interview for The Times in 1899, Twain was reported to be considering a work which would be unpublished for a century.

Twain wrote instructions for future "editors, heirs and assigns" in 1904. In these he celebrates that posthumous publication allowed him to speak with his "whole frank mind."
These also outlined a century-long plan of publications 25 years apart, with progressively more potentially controversial material included. In the introduction to the second edition of Mark Twain's Own Autobiography: The Chapters from the North American Review, the scholar Michael Kiskis suggests that these delays were less due to Twain's (purported) concern for those who could be aggrieved by the text, and more likely an attempt to extend the copyright.

Various modern reports refer to a "100 year embargo" imposed by Twain on his own autobiography's release which expired in 2010.

20th century publications

Twain himself had published Chapters from My Autobiography in twenty-five instalments in the North American Review in 1906-7. Since Twain's death in 1910, a number of different editors have made attempts to impose some order on the whole of the material by selection and reorganization, producing several decidedly different published versions of The Autobiography. Creating a publishable Autobiography from the disorganised mass of Twain's unpublished writings has proven to be a significant challenge, and access to the physical materials of Twain's papers was, for the first half-century, greatly limited to just small numbers of scholars.

The partial Autobiography was published in 1924 by Harper & Brothers, consisting of about two-fifths of the material. It was compiled by personal friend and literary executor Albert Bigelow Paine, who at the time had exclusive access to Twain's papers.

Editor and historian Bernard DeVoto succeeded Paine as literary executor for the Clemens estate, and used his access to the material to produce four book collections of Autobiography material: Mark Twain in Eruption (1940), The Portable Mark Twain (1946), Mark Twain at Work (1952), and Letters from the Earth (1962). The much-delayed publication of the latter was due to objections from Clara Clemens.

Two publications were made from re-arrangements of previously published work. In 1959 Charles Neider rejected both Paine's in-order-of-creation and DeVoto's arranged-by-topic approaches and rearranged material to match the chronology of a standard autobiography. In 1990 (republished February 2010) scholar Michael Kiskis edited Mark Twain’s Own Autobiography: The Chapters from the North American Review.

Mark Twain Project edition

The Mark Twain Project of The Bancroft Library undertook to produce a complete autobiography of Twain, based upon material within their collection. The stated goal is "to publish the complete text as nearly as possible in the way Mark Twain intended it to be published after his death.". This was published in three-volumes between 2010 and 2015, with the first in the 100th anniversary year of Twain's death. All three volumes are available online with introductions and historical annotation from the editors also included with the text. The head editor for this work was Harriet Elinor Smith.

The first volume of a three-volume edition runs to 760 pages. It includes introductory material explaining how Twain's autobiography was written. Then follows Twain's early, fragmentary attempts at writing it; and the text of his autobiographical dictations (the main series), beginning on 10 January 1906. Volume 1 collects these up until 30 March 1906.

Volume 2 was published in October 2013 and runs to 736 pages. This collects dictations from 2 April 1906 until 28 February 1907.

The third and final volume of the Mark Twain Project edition was published in October 2015. It contains 792 pages with entries dated from 1 March 1907 to 21 October 1909. Twain's autobiography closes with a piece written in December 1909 where he laments the death of his daughter Jean and declares that, with her, his motivation for writing the autobiography has died.

Suffixing the third volume is the 429-page "Ashcroft-Lyon Manuscript" written in 1909. In this Twain attacks his secretary, Isabel Lyon, and business manager, Ralph Ashcroft, for alleged embezzlement of money from the author and for manipulation of Twain's relationship with Jean, much to her distress. It takes the form of a letter to William Dean Howells, though it was never sent nor intended to be so. It was not intended by Twain to include this as part of his autobiography, and it had never been published prior to 2015 — though it had been available to scholars as part of his papers. The 21st-century editors considered it sufficiently important to include within this publication.

Copyright status
The version published in 2010, representing Twain's attempts from 1906 and earlier, would have entered the public domain by  under ordinary circumstances. The state of the law at the time of his death notwithstanding, the 1976 revision provided that unpublished works created before January 1, 1978 would have entered the public domain by 2003. However, the publishers, the Mark Twain Foundation and the University of California Press, published the 2010 version in secret on microfilm in 2001, selling all three upcoming volumes for $50,000. Because of this, the 2010 version bears copyright marks for 2001 and 2010, and will not enter the public domain until 2047, 137 years after Mark Twain's death. David Bollier criticized the Foundation and UC Press for this move, saying, "So is the argument that academic presses have a special entitlement to game the usual terms of copyright law because they are doing God's work as academic presses?  Copyright industries frequently inveigh against the 'theft' of sharing copyrighted works online, solemnly intoning that 'the law is the law.'  So is a theft not a theft when the victim is the public, and not a private copyright holder?"

References

External links
 
 Mark Twain Project edition: Volume 1, Volume 2, Volume 3
This is Mark Twain, combines video slideshows, images, interviews with the editors and other Mark Twain scholars, and audio clips of excerpts, to explore the Autobiography of Mark Twain.
 

1924 non-fiction books
2010 non-fiction books
Books by Mark Twain
Literary autobiographies
Unfinished books
University of California Press books
Books published posthumously
American autobiographies